John Ingvar Lövgren, later renamed John Ingvar Andersson (22 October 1930 – 9 February 2002) was a Swedish serial killer and rapist who confessed to four murders committed between 1958 and 1963 in the Stockholm region. Lövgren was convicted and sentenced to closed  psychiatric treatment at Salberga prison. He went under the name Flickmördaren ("The Girl Killer"), because his last two victims were young girls. He was, at the time of his death in 2002, no longer in treatment due to poor health, which he had received from his cancer. He was buried at Sala cemetery.

Biography
Lövgren's parents died when he was young and he was subsequently placed in a foster home. As an adult, Lövgren became infamous for drinking heavily and exposing himself to women, for which he was convicted several times. Because of this he was enrolled in several different psychiatric hospitals between 1953 and 1961. The authorities described him as childish and weak, probably with a mild intellectual disability. At the time of the murders, Lövgren held a job as a gardener. 

After the murder of Ann-Kristin Svensson in September 1963, her playmates identified Lövgren as the perpetrator. In addition, while fleeing the crime scene, he left traces in the form of Svensson's clothes in desperate attempt to get rid of them, with these traces leading the authorities to Lövgren's residential area.

After he was arrested, Lövgren confessed to another murder: the unsolved murder of 26-year-old Agneta Nyholm in Fruängen in June 1958. Despite this, Lövgren was never convicted of her murder and her case has since been statute-barred. Police, however, consider it solved and Lövgren to be the assailant.

Literature
 The novel The Man on the Balcony released by Sjöwall/Wahlöö in 1967 was based on John Ingvar Lövgren and his crimes.
 The true face of the assassination: a criminal commissioner's memories by Gösta W. Larsson (1971), published by Stockholm: Bonniers

Victims
Agneta Nyholm, 26 - murdered on the night of 27 June 1958 at her home in Fruängen.
Greta Löfgren, 62 - raped and murdered in November 1962 in her home at Kungsholmen.
Berit Glesing, 6 - raped and murdered on 12 August 1963 in Vita Bergen at Södermalm.
Ann-Kristin Svensson, 4 - raped and murdered on 2 September 1963 in Aspudden.

See also
List of serial killers by country

References

1930 births
2002 deaths
20th-century Swedish criminals
Deaths from cancer in Sweden
Male serial killers
People convicted of murder by Sweden
Prisoners and detainees of Sweden
Serial killers who died in prison custody
Swedish murderers of children
Swedish people convicted of murder
Swedish rapists
Swedish serial killers